FC Torpedo-ZIL (Russian: Футбольный клуб Торпедо-ЗИЛ) was a Russian football club from Moscow.

History

The team was founded in 1997 after Torpedo Moscow, which played in the Russian Top Division, became a property of SC Luzhniki and was not related to the automobile plant anymore. Soon afterwards ZiL decided to revive their own team.

Torpedo-ZIL made a debut in the Third Division in 1997. The club won promotion to the Premier League in 2000. In both 2001 and 2002, Torpedo-ZIL finished 14th out of 16 teams. In the beginning of 2003, due to inability to finance a Premier League team, ZIL had to sell first 55 percent, and two months later all remaining stock to Norilsk Nickel. Metallurgy giant renamed the team FC Torpedo-Metallurg, and a year later used it to form a new club, FC Moscow. At the same time, ZIL created another team in the Third Division which was originally known as FC Torpedo-RG and was later renamed back to FC Torpedo-ZIL Moscow. That team has also since been disbanded.

Domestic history

References

External links
Torpedo. Nostalgia and reality

Torpedo-ZIL
1997 establishments in Russia
2004 disestablishments in Russia
Association football clubs established in 1997
Association football clubs disestablished in 2004